The Federal Route 1 is the first federal road in Malaysia, the oldest federal road in Malaysia, and among the nation's earliest public roadways ever constructed. The Federal Route 1 was the backbone of the road system in the western states of Peninsular Malaysia before being supplanted by the North–South Expressway (E1 and E2).

Route background

The Federal Route 1 is one of the three north–south backbone federal highways in Peninsular Malaysia; the other two are the Federal Routes 3 and 5.

The Kilometre Zero of the Federal Route 1 is located at the former site of the now-demolished Tanjung Puteri CIQ Complex in Johor Bahru, where it connected to the Johor–Singapore Causeway at the Malaysia–Singapore border. Since 2008, the Federal Route 1 has been disconnected from the Causeway when the new Sultan Iskandar CIQ Complex was opened, with new access roads linking the Causeway to the CIQ Complex.

At the first kilometre at the city of Johor Bahru, it is connected with the Federal Route 3, the main trunk road of the east coast of Peninsular Malaysia. Next, at Kilometre 19 which is at Skudai, the route is connected with the Federal Route 5  which is the main trunk road of the west coast of Peninsular Malaysia.

The Federal Route 1 is the main trunk road at the interior part of Peninsular Malaysia but passes the western states. From Tampin to Sungai Siput, the FT1 highway runs along the western foothills of the Titiwangsa Range. The FT1 highway intersects with the Federal Route 2 at Kuala Lumpur before intersecting with another end of the Federal Route 5 at Ipoh. At Sungai Siput, Perak, the route changes its direction westbound and later becomes the main west coastal route, starting from Changkat Jering, Perak to Alor Setar, Kedah. The route meets with the North–South Expressway Northern Route E1 at Jitra, Kedah and the section of the North–South Expressway from Jitra to Bukit Kayu Hitam is a part of the Federal Route 1.

There are 92 street names associated with the Federal Route 1 along its entire length.

It is estimated that over a million Malaysians rely on the Federal Route 1 users as their main economic source.

History

The Federal Route 1 is believed to be the nation's earliest public roadway constructed. Construction began in 1880 under the orders on the Sultan of Kedah at that time, Sultan Ahmad Tajuddin Mukarram Shah, connecting Alor Setar, Kedah to Songkhla, Thailand. Today, the road is also a part of the Phetkasem Road (Thailand Route 4), Routes 407 and 414 in Thailand.

The road grew in importance as it connected most of the state capitals on the west coast (except Perlis and Malacca), and as a result, numerous towns grew along its path. The next phases were mostly constructed by the British colonial government as a means to provide an efficient transportation network to exploit the economic resources in Malaya. The second section being completed was Perai–Ipoh section, opened to traffic in 1897. In 1915, the Kuala Lumpur–Ipoh and Johor Bahru–Kulai sections were completed. In 1924, the Johor–Singapore Causeway was completed, connecting Johor Bahru to the island of Singapore. The next sections being completed were Butterworth–Alor Setar and Kulai–Yong Peng sections, both were opened to traffic in 1928. The entire roadway was finally concluded in 1939 after the completion of the final section connecting Yong Peng to Tampin in 1939.

During the Second World War, the Federal Route 1 sustained heavy damages during the Malayan Campaign between the British army and the Imperial Japanese Army. During the campaign, it was estimated that more than 100 bridges were blown by the Royal Engineers in order to stop the Japanese advances southwards. Among the most famous bridges being blown were the Sungai Kelamah Bridge (also known as the Gemencheh Bridge), Gemas Bridge and Buloh Kasap Bridge – all of them were located at the Federal Route 1 – as a result of the Battle of Gemas which had claimed the lives of more than 1,000 Imperial Japanese soldiers. After the Second World War ended, the FT1 road was restored and damaged bridges were rebuilt.

A lot of improvements were implemented towards the Federal Route 1 after the independence of Malaya in 1957 and the formation of Malaysia in 1963. Among the earliest improvements during the post-independent Malaya was the construction of the Merdeka Bridge at the Penang–Kedah state border. It was constructed to replace the old bridge that was destroyed in 1942 during the Second World War. The bridge assumed its name for being opened to motorists during the year of Malayan independence.

In 1966, the Tanjung Malim–Slim River Highway FT1 was opened to motorists, becoming the earliest toll road in Malaysia. The two-lane highway bypassed the former section between Slim River to Tanjung Malim, which would later be downgraded to Perak State Route A121 and Federal Route 193

The improvements of the FT1 route were also being implemented within the Federal Territory of Kuala Lumpur as well, in order to improve the highway network within the city. A lack of proper highway planning was blamed for the severe congestion in the city. At that time, the FT1 route within Kuala Lumpur consisted of Jalan Cheras, Jalan Pudu, Jalan Tun Perak (formerly known as Java Street and then Mountbatten Road), Jalan Tuanku Abdul Rahman and Jalan Ipoh (both previously known as Batu Road). Under the recommendation from the 1979 Klang Valley Review Report, the FT1 route in Kuala Lumpur was rerouted to a new road system consisting Jalan Loke Yew, Jalan Maharajalela, Jalan Kinabalu and Jalan Kuching as a traffic dispersal means as well as providing the constant continuity of the FT1 route in Kuala Lumpur. One of the components of the new road system was the Jalan Kinabalu viaduct, which was opened on 15 March 1963.

The most controversial development of the FT1 highway in Kuala Lumpur was the toll collection at Jalan Kuching FT1. The nine-year concession of Jalan Kuching FT1 was awarded to Kamunting Corporation Berhad, signed on 15 April 1985. In the original concessionaire agreement, Kamunting Corporation Berhad was required to build an interchange at Kepong Roundabout and to upgrade the Jalan Kepong FT54, in return for the nine-year toll collection rights starting from 1987 until 1996. However, in 1987, the concessionaire agreement was amended, and Kamunting Corporation Berhad was required to add two more lanes from the existing four lanes along Jalan Kuching FT1, resulting in another 7-year extension of toll concession which was ended in 2003. The toll collection at Jalan Kuching FT1 had sparked fury among Kuala Lumpurian motorists, and numerous protests were held to urge the government to end the toll collection there. The toll collection at Jalan Kuching FT1 was finally abolished on 8 January 2003.

In 1977, the government proposed to build a new north–south divided highway as an alternative to the Federal Route 1, which would be later known as the North–South Expressway E1 and E2. The proposal to build the new highway was mooted as a result of the severe congestion along the Federal Route 1. Because of the financially massive scale of the project, the highway was planned to be privatised and tolled, but none of the constructors being invited by the government were willing to do the job due to economic uncertainties at that time and the plan could not be materialised. It was only after Tun Dr. Mahathir Mohamad became the Prime Minister that the North–South Expressway project was revived. The North–South Expressway was launched in 1981, where the Jitra–Bukit Kayu Hitam section was constructed as an upgrade of the existing Federal Route 1 section into a divided highway with partial access control and at-grade intersections. At that time, the construction of the Kuala Lumpur–Seremban Expressway E2 was still ongoing, and therefore the expressway would later form the pioneer route for the southern route. Unlike the other sections of the North–South Expressway, the Jitra–Bukit Kayu Hitam section did not comply with the expressway standards defined by the Arahan Teknik 8/86: A Guide on Geometric Design of Roads which was only published by the Malaysian Public Works Department (JKR) later in 1986, resulting the section to be grandfathered as a part of the North–South Expressway E1. After the North–South Expressway was completed in 1994, the expressway took the role of the Federal Route 1 as the main backbone route in Peninsular Malaysia.

Apart from the Jitra–Bukit Kayu Hitam section that was being upgraded to be a part of the North–South Expressway E1, there are some other sections of the FT1 highway that have been upgraded to toll roads and controlled-access expressways. For example, the Skudai Highway FT1 was completed in November 1985 as a tolled divided highway until 1 March 2004. Meanwhile, Jalan Cheras–Kajang FT1 was upgraded from the former two-lane road into an eight-lane controlled-access expressway known as the Cheras–Kajang Expressway E7/FT1. The expressway was opened to traffic on 15 January 1999.

Much of the road remains in use, although in September 2009, portions of the road north of Ipoh were temporarily closed to facilitate double tracking and electrification along the Ipoh–Padang Besar railway line.

List of junctions and towns (south–north)

References

See also
 Malaysia Federal Route 3 – the east coastal counterpart of the Federal Route 1
 Malaysia Federal Route 5 – the west coastal counterpart of the Federal Route 1
 North–South Expressway – the nation's longest controlled-access expressway that runs in parallel with the Federal Route 1

001